This is a list of women writers who were born in North Macedonia or whose writings are closely associated with that country.

B
 Rumena Bužarovska (born 1981), writer

D
 Lidija Dimkovska (born 1971), poet

J
 Irena Jordanova (born September 8, 1980), writer

M
 Slavka Maneva (February 2, 1934 – January 8, 2010), writer and poet

S
 Ana Stojanoska (born 22 November 1977), theatre researcher and writer

See also
List of women writers
List of Macedonian writers

References

Macedonian women writers, List of

-
Writers
Women writers, List of Macedonian